Rhondes is a genus of New Caledonian jumping spiders that was first described by Eugène Louis Simon in 1901. It was briefly considered a synonym of Hasarius, but was revalidated after the results of a 2008 molecular study. It is now grouped with several other Australasian genera in the unranked clade Astioida.

Species
 it contains six species, found only on New Caledonia:
Rhondes atypicus Patoleta, 2016 – New Caledonia
Rhondes berlandi Patoleta, 2016 – New Caledonia
Rhondes flexibilis Patoleta, 2016 – New Caledonia
Rhondes neocaledonicus (Simon, 1889) (type) – New Caledonia
Rhondes sarasini Patoleta, 2016 – New Caledonia
Rhondes zofiae Patoleta, 2016 – New Caledonia

References

Salticidae genera
Salticidae
Spiders of Australia